The 1948 Stanley Cup Finals was a best-of-seven series between the Detroit Red Wings and the defending champion Toronto Maple Leafs. The Maple Leafs won the series in four straight games to win their second consecutive Stanley Cup and eighth overall.

Paths to the Finals
Detroit defeated the New York Rangers 4–2 to advance to the Finals. Toronto defeated the Boston Bruins 4–1 to advance to the Finals.

Game summaries
This was the Stanley Cup debut series for Detroit's Gordie Howe, and the last for Toronto's Syl Apps who retired after the series.

Stanley Cup engraving
The 1948 Stanley Cup was presented to Maple Leafs captain Syl Apps by NHL President Clarence Campbell following the Maple Leafs 7–2 win over the Red Wings in game four.

The following Maple Leafs players and staff had their names engraved on the Stanley Cup

1947–48 Toronto Maple Leafs

See also
 1947–48 NHL season

References and notes

 Podnieks, Andrew; Hockey Hall of Fame (2004). Lord Stanley's Cup. Bolton, Ont.: Fenn Pub. pp 12, 50. 

Stanley Cup
Stanley Cup Finals
Detroit Red Wings games
Toronto Maple Leafs games
 
Ice hockey competitions in Detroit
Ice hockey competitions in Toronto
Stanley Cup Finals
Stanley Cup Finals
Stanley Cup
Stanley Cup Finals 
Stanley Cup Finals 
Stanley Cup Finals, 1948
Stanley Cup Finals